Anushka Shetty is an Indian actress, who primarily works in the South Indian film industries, she is the highest paid actress of South India and one of the highest paid actress of India. She is one of the few actresses to receive maximum awards in the industry. A three-time Filmfare Award recipient, Shetty has also received two Nandi awards and a Tamil Nadu State Film Award & Kalaimamani from the state governments of Andhra Pradesh and Tamil Nadu respectively. Highly praised for her performances in the critically acclaimed Arundhati, Vedam, Deiva Thirumagal, Rudhramadevi, Baahubali 2: The Conclusion & Bhaagamathie. Shetty gained global stardom and fame with the magnum opus Bahubali series in which she acted as the female protagonist.

Filmfare Awards South

South Indian International Movie Awards

Nandi Awards

Tamil Nadu State Film Awards

CineMAA Awards

Santosham Film Awards

Vijay Awards

Behindwoods Gold Medals

Zee Cine Awards - Telugu

TSR-TV9 National Film Awards

Edison Awards (Tamil)

South Scope Style Awards

Ugadi Awards (Telugu)

International Tamil Film Awards

Jaya TV Awards

Apsara Awards

International Indian Film Academy Awards|IIFA Utsavam

Hyderabad Times Film Awards

Radio City Cine Awards

Cinegoers Association Awards

Vamsee Film Awards

Bharatumuni Film Awards

Other Awards and Honours

References

Shetty, Anushka